The Dark Backward (also known as The Man with Three Arms) is a 1991 American satirical comedy film written and directed by Adam Rifkin, and starring Judd Nelson, Bill Paxton, Wayne Newton, and Lara Flynn Boyle. The film features special makeup effects by Alterian, Inc.

Plot summary
Marty Malt (Judd Nelson) is an unhappy garbage man who moonlights as an atrociously unfunny standup comic. He lives in a dark, grimy, garbage-strewn urban netherworld, where a company named Blump's apparently owns everything. His best friend and fellow trash collector, Gus (Bill Paxton), is the only one who laughs at his jokes, and his sincerity is questionable. The obnoxiously exuberant Gus plays an accordion, which he always carries with him. Marty is seeing Rosarita (Lara Flynn Boyle), a waitress, but she doesn't seem too interested in him.

One day, Gus convinces a talent agent, Jackie Chrome (Wayne Newton), to check out Marty's act. Jackie isn't impressed. Marty's luck seems to take a turn for the worse when a large lump starts growing on his back. He goes to a quack doctor (James Caan), who calls him a wimp and puts a Band-Aid on the lump. The lump continues to grow, eventually becoming a full-sized arm. While Gus uses Marty's newfound freakishness to impress his morbidly obese girlfriends, a horrified Rosarita breaks up with Marty, and he gets fired from the club where he does his act.

Marty is despondent until Gus brings him to see Jackie, who, it turns out, has always dreamed of finding a real three-armed comic. Re-christened "Desi the Three-Armed Wonder Comic," and with Gus now providing musical accompaniment, Marty gets a fresh start on his career. Marty and Gus have a few semi-successful shows and eventually meet Hollywood talent agent Dirk Delta (Rob Lowe), who offers them a job. Marty, Gus and Jackie celebrate this big break and everything seems to be looking up until Marty wakes up the following morning and discovers his third arm has inexplicably vanished.

He goes with Gus to see Jackie, who is furious at first but calms down and decides to tell Dirk the truth upon Marty's suggestion. After calling Dirk and telling him the bad news, Dirk surprisingly asks them to send Gus to fill the spot with his accordion playing. Gus is ecstatic and leaves almost immediately. Marty is sad but gets his job back at the club and uses the story of his third arm in his act and finally gets a few laughs from the crowd.

Cast
 Judd Nelson as Marty Malt  
 Bill Paxton as Gus  
 Wayne Newton as Jackie Chrome  
 Lara Flynn Boyle as Rosarita  
 James Caan as Doctor Scurvy  
 Rob Lowe as Dirk Delta  
 King Moody as Twinkee Doodle  
 Claudia Christian as Kitty  
 Danny Dayton as Syd
 Tony Cox as Human Xylophone

Release
The film was released theatrically on July 26, 1991. In March 1992, the film was released on videocassette and laserdisc by RCA/Columbia.  Sony Pictures Home Entertainment released a special edition DVD on August 21, 2007.

Reception

Box office
The Dark Backward performed extremely poorly during its limited run, making only $28,654.

Critical response
The film received mostly negative reviews upon its release. It received a 45% approval rating at Rotten Tomatoes based on 11 reviews (five positive, six negative). Janet Maslin of the New York Times criticized the film's silly story, poor acting and grotesque scenes, calling the film a confused David Lynch wanna-be that "concentrates only on stomach-turning trivia and on the kind of exaggeratedly stupid behavior that amounts to directorial condescension" and "the film's efforts to say something about success and its capriciousness never succeed in rising above an elbow-in-the-ribs obviousness." Scott Weinberg of eFilmCritic.com gave the film a rating of 1.5 out of 5 saying it "tries way too hard to be a cult classic, which probably explains why it's not one."

Not all reviews were negative. Brian Webster of the Apollo Guide enjoyed the film, giving it a score of 74/100 and describing it as "Odd and twisted, The Dark Backward has plenty to thrill admirers of ugliness and enough food for thought to interest the rest of us too."

References

External links
 
 
 
 

1991 films
Films shot in California
Films shot in Los Angeles
American independent films
American satirical films
1991 comedy films
Films directed by Adam Rifkin
1990s English-language films
1990s American films